O Glorioso Retorno de Quem Nunca Esteve Aqui ("The Glorious Return of Someone who Was Never Here") is the first studio album by the Brazilian rapper Emicida. The album was released on August 21, 2013, by the independent label Laboratório Fantasma.  O Glorioso Retorno de Quem Nunca Esteve Aqui was supported by two singles: "Crisântemo" featuring Dona Jacira and "Hoje cedo" featuring Pitty.

Track listing

References

2013 debut albums
Emicida albums